Alexander Scott may refer to:

Entertainment
Alexander Scott (16th-century poet) (c. 1520–1582/83), Scottish poet
Alexander Scott (20th-century poet) (1920–1989), Scottish poet, playwright and campaigning scholar
Alexander Scott (painter) (1872–1925), British painter
Alexander "Scotty" Scott, spy played by Bill Cosby in the television series I Spy

Religion
Alexander John Scott (1768–1840), British chaplain and friend of Horatio Nelson
Alexander John Scott (principal) (1805–1866), Scottish dissident theologian, and first principal of Owens College, Manchester

Science
Alexander Scott (chemist) (1853–1947), Director of Scientific Research at the British Museum
Alexander Scott (geologist) (1890–1951), Scottish geologist
Alexander Walker Scott (1800–1883), Australian entomologist

Other
Alexander Scott (architect) (1920-2005), British architect
Alexander Scott (Medal of Honor) (1844–1923), American soldier
Alexander Ritchie Scott (1874–1962), Scottish mathematician
Alexander MacCallum Scott (1874–1928), British Member of Parliament for Glasgow Bridgeton, 1910–1922

See also

Alex Scott (disambiguation)
Al Scott (disambiguation)